The Matrix Reloaded is a 2003 American science-fiction action film written and directed by the Wachowskis. It is a sequel to The Matrix (1999) and the second installment in the Matrix film series. The film stars Keanu Reeves, Laurence Fishburne, Carrie-Anne Moss, Hugo Weaving and Gloria Foster who reprise their roles from the previous film, while Jada Pinkett Smith was introduced in the cast.

The film premiered on May 7, 2003, in Westwood, Los Angeles, California, and had its worldwide release by Warner Bros. Pictures on May 15, 2003, including a screening out of competition at the 2003 Cannes Film Festival. The video game Enter the Matrix and The Animatrix, a collection of short animations, supported and expanded the film's story.

The film received generally positive reviews from critics, although most felt it inferior to the first film. It grossed $741.8 million worldwide, breaking Terminator 2: Judgment Days record and becoming the highest-grossing R-rated film of all time, until Deadpool surpassed it in 2016. In addition, it was the third-highest-grossing film of 2003, behind The Lord of the Rings: The Return of the King and Finding Nemo. A direct sequel titled The Matrix Revolutions was released six months later in November 2003.

Plot
Six months after the events of The Matrix, Neo and Trinity are now romantically involved. Morpheus receives a message from Captain Niobe of the Logos calling an emergency meeting of all ships of Zion. An army of Sentinels is tunneling towards Zion and will reach it within 72 hours. Commander Lock orders all ships to return to Zion to prepare, but Morpheus asks one ship to remain to contact the Oracle. Within the Matrix, the lone ship's crew is encountered by the former Agent Smith, who copies himself over the body of crew member Bane and uses the phone line to leave the Matrix.

In Zion, Morpheus announces the news of the advancing machines. The Nebuchadnezzar leaves Zion and enters the Matrix, where Neo meets the Oracle's bodyguard Seraph, who leads him to her. The Oracle reveals that she is part of the Matrix and instructs Neo to reach its Source with the help of the Keymaker. As the Oracle departs, Smith appears, telling Neo that after being defeated by him, he became a rogue program. He demonstrates his ability to clone himself over other inhabitants of the Matrix, including the new upgraded Agents. He tries to take over Neo's body but fails, prompting a battle between Neo and many copies of Smith. Neo defends himself, but is forced to retreat.

Neo, Morpheus, and Trinity visit the Merovingian, who is imprisoning the Keymaker. The Merovingian, a rogue program with his own agenda, refuses to let him go. His wife Persephone, seeking revenge on her husband for his infidelity, leads the trio to the Keymaker. Morpheus, Trinity, and the Keymaker flee while Neo holds off the Merovingian's henchmen. Morpheus and Trinity try to escape with the Keymaker, pursued by several Agents and the Merovingian's chief henchmen, the Twins. After a long chase, Trinity escapes, Morpheus defeats the Twins, and Neo saves Morpheus and the Keymaker from Agent Johnson.

The crews of the Nebuchadnezzar, Vigilant, and Logos help the Keymaker and Neo reach the Source. The Logos crew must destroy a power plant and the Vigilant crew must disable a back-up power station to bypass a security system, which will allow Neo to enter the Source. Haunted by a vision of Trinity's death, he asks her to remain on the Nebuchadnezzar. The Logos is successful, but the Vigilant is destroyed by a Sentinel. Trinity replaces the Vigilant crew and completes their mission. Agent Thompson corners her and they fight. As Neo, Morpheus, and the Keymaker try to reach the Source, the Smiths ambush them. The Keymaker is killed after unlocking the door to the Source for Neo.

Neo meets a program called the Architect, the creator of the Matrix, who explains that as the One, Neo is himself an intentional part of the design of the Matrix, which is now in its sixth iteration. Neo is meant to stop the Matrix's fatal system crash that naturally recurs due to the concept of human choice within it. As with the five previous Ones, Neo has a choice: either reboot the Matrix from the Source and pick a handful of survivors to repopulate the soon-to-be-destroyed Zion, as his predecessors all did, or go to save the imperiled Trinity, causing the Matrix to crash and killing everyone in it. Neo chooses the latter, prompting a dismissive response from the Architect.

Neo's vision of Trinity comes true as she is shot by Agent Thompson while falling off a building. Before she hits the ground, Neo arrives and catches her. He then removes the bullet from her chest and restarts her heart. They return to the real world, where Sentinels attack them. The Nebuchadnezzar is destroyed, but the crew escape. As the Sentinels catch up to them, Neo realizes he is able to sense the machines in the real world, and telepathically destroys them but falls into a coma from the effort. The crew are picked up by another ship, the Hammer. Its captain reveals that other ships defending Zion were wiped out by the machines after someone prematurely activated an EMP. Only one survivor was found: the Smith-possessed Bane.

Cast

Zee was originally played by Aaliyah, who died in a plane crash on August 25, 2001, before filming was complete, requiring her scenes to be reshot with Nona Gaye. Jet Li was offered the role of Seraph, but turned it down as he did not want his martial arts moves digitally recorded.

Production

Filming
The Matrix Reloaded was largely filmed at Fox Studios in Australia. Filming began on March 1, 2001 and ended on August 21, 2002, concurrently with the filming of the sequel, Revolutions. The freeway chase and "Burly Brawl" scenes were filmed at the decommissioned Naval Air Station Alameda in Alameda, California. The producers constructed a 1.5-mile freeway on the old runways specifically for the film. Some portions of the chase were also filmed in Oakland, California, and the tunnel shown briefly is the Webster Tube, which connects Oakland and Alameda. Some post-production editing was also done in old aircraft hangars on the base. The city of Akron, Ohio was willing to give full access to Route 59, the stretch of freeway known as the "Innerbelt", for filming of the freeway chase when it was under consideration. However, producers decided against this as "the time to reset all the cars in their start position would take too long". General Motors was hired to donate over 300 cars to be used during production, destroying them for the sake of creating art. MythBusters would later reuse the Alameda location in order to explore the effects of a head-on collision between two semi trucks, and to perform various other experiments. It took 27 days to film the Burly Brawl sequence, which was combined with motion capture and CGI. This would become one of the most expensive action scenes, costing $40 million to make. Around 97% of the materials from the sets of the film were recycled after production was completed; for example, tons of wood were sent to Mexico to build low-income housing.

Visual effects
Following the success of the previous film, the Wachowskis came up with extremely difficult action sequences, such as the Burly Brawl, a scene in which Neo had to fight 100 Agent Smiths. To develop technologies for the film, Warner Bros. launched ESC Entertainment. The ESC team tried to figure out how to bring the Wachowskis' vision to the screen, but because bullet time required arrays of carefully aligned cameras and months of planning, even for a brief scene featuring two or three actors, a scene like the Burly Brawl seemed almost impossible as envisioned and could take years to composite. Eventually John Gaeta realized that the technology he and his crew had developed for The Matrixs bullet time was no longer sufficient and concluded they needed a virtual camera (in other words, a simulation of a camera). Having before used real photographs of buildings as texture for 3D models in The Matrix, the team started digitizing all data, such as scenes, characters' motions, or even the reflectivity of Neo's cassock. The reflectivity of objects needs to be captured and simulated adequately and Paul Debevec et al. captured the reflectance of the human face and Borshukov's work was strongly based on the findings of Debevec et al. They developed "Universal Capture", a process which samples and stores facial details and expressions at high resolution, then capture expressions from Reeves and Weaving using dense capture and multi-camera setup (similar to the bullet time rig) photogrammetric capture technique called optical flow. The algorithm for Universal Capture was written by George Borshukov, visual effects lead at ESC, who had also created the photo-realistic buildings for the visual effects in The Matrix. With this collected wealth of data and the right algorithms, they finally were able to create virtual cinematography in which characters, locations, and events can all be created digitally and viewed through virtual cameras, eliminating the restrictions of real cameras, years of compositing data, and replacing the use of still camera arrays or, in some scenes, cameras altogether. The ESC team rendered the final effects using the program Mental Ray.

Music

Don Davis, who composed for The Matrix, returned to score Reloaded. For many of the pivotal action sequences, such as the "Burly Brawl", he collaborated with Juno Reactor. Some of the collaborative cues by Davis and Juno Reactor are extensions of material by Juno Reactor; for example, a version of "Komit" featuring Davis' strings is used during a flying sequence, and "Burly Brawl" is essentially a combination of Davis' unused "Multiple Replication" and a piece similar to Juno Reactor's "Masters of the Universe". One of the collaborations, "Mona Lisa Overdrive", is titled in reference to the cyberpunk novel of the same name by William Gibson, a major influence on the directors.

Leitmotifs established in The Matrix return — such as the Matrix main theme, Neo and Trinity's love theme, the Sentinel's theme, Neo's flying theme, and a more frequent use of the four-note Agent Smith theme — and others used in Revolutions are established.

As with its predecessor, many tracks by external musicians are featured in the movie, its closing credits, and the soundtrack album, some of which were written for the film. Many of the musicians featured, for example Rob Zombie, Rage Against the Machine and Marilyn Manson, had also appeared on the soundtrack for The Matrix. Rob Dougan also re-contributed, licensing the instrumental version of "Furious Angels", as well as being commissioned to provide an original track, ultimately scoring the battle in the Merovingian's chateau. A remixed version of "Slap It" by electronic artist Fluke — listed on the soundtrack as "Zion" — was used during the rave scene.

Linkin Park contributed their instrumental song "Session" to the film as well, although it did not appear during the course of the film. P.O.D. composed a song called "Sleeping Awake", with a music video which focused heavily on Neo, as well as many images that were part of the film. Both songs played during the film's credits.

It was originally planned for the electronic band Röyksopp to create the soundtrack, but this offer was turned down.

Reception

Box office
The Matrix Reloaded earned an estimated $5 million during Wednesday night previews in the United States and Canada. It grossed $37.5 million on its Thursday opening day from 3,603 theaters, which was the second-highest opening day after Spider-Mans $39.4 million. The film earned $91.7 million during its opening weekend and $134.3 million in its first four days, including the previews. This made it not only the second-highest opening weekend of all time, but also the biggest opening weekend for any Warner Bros. film, beating Harry Potter and the Sorcerer's Stone. For six years, the film would hold the record for having the largest number of screenings for an R-rated film until the opening of Watchmen in March 2009. The Matrix Reloaded also surpassed Star Wars: Episode II – Attack of the Clones to have the highest Thursday opening. It would hold this record for two years until it was taken by Star Wars: Episode III – Revenge of the Sith in 2005. Additionally, the film had the highest opening weekend for an R-rated film, overturning the previous record held by Hannibal. With a total gross of $146.9 million, The Matrix Reloaded held the record for having the biggest six-day opening until 2004, when it was surpassed by Spider-Man 2.

The film held the number one spot during its opening weekend, taking the position from X2. This would be handed to Bruce Almighty, which would be later dethroned by Finding Nemo. The opening weekend represented roughly 60% of that weekend's box-office tally, but some box-office prognosticators noted it fell short of lofty expectations set by some in the industry. The Matrix Reloaded and Finding Nemo both teamed up with Bruce Almighty, X2 and Pirates of the Caribbean: The Curse of the Black Pearl to become the first five films to make $200 million at the box office in a single summer season. This was also the fourth R-rated film to cross that mark, just after Beverly Hills Cop, Terminator 2: Judgment Day and Saving Private Ryan. It would remain as the year's top-grossing film until Finding Nemo overtook it in July.

Internationally, The Matrix Reloaded opened in 13 territories, including Australia and France, and grossed $37.5 million in its first week. It expanded to most international territories (62) the following weekend, except Japan and India, and became the first movie to earn more than $100 million outside the U.S. in one weekend, taking its overseas total to $176 million and worldwide total to $385 million. Grossing over $113.2 million, the film scored the highest international opening weekend, breaking the previous record held by The Lord of the Rings: The Two Towers. In Japan, it had the biggest opening of any film in the country, earning $11.5 million and smashing the previous record held by Harry Potter and the Chamber of Secrets. There were other opening records in Russia and South Korea. The Japan and South Korea opening records were both given to Spider-Man 3 in 2007. 

The film ultimately grossed $281.6 million in the US, and $739.4 million worldwide, becoming the third-highest-grossing film of 2003, after Finding Nemo and The Lord of the Rings: The Return of the King. It would have the highest domestic gross for an R-rated film until it was taken by The Passion of the Christ the next year. For over a decade, The Matrix Reloaded held the record for being the highest-grossing R-rated film worldwide before Deadpool took it 13 years later. The film sold an estimated 46,695,900 tickets in North America. Following re-releases, the worldwide gross of the film is $741.8 million.

Critical response
On Rotten Tomatoes, the film holds an approval rating of 74% based on 246 reviews, and an average score of 6.80/10. The site's critical consensus states: "Though its heady themes are a departure from its predecessor, The Matrix Reloaded is a worthy sequel packed with popcorn-friendly thrills." On Metacritic the film has a weighted average score 62 out of 100 based on 40 reviews, indicating "generally favorable reviews". Audiences polled by CinemaScore gave the film an average grade of "B+" on an A+ to F scale, a grade down from the "A−" earned by the previous film.

Positive comments from critics included commendation for the quality and intensity of its action sequences, and its intelligence. Tony Toscano of Talking Pictures had high praise for the film, saying that "its character development and writing...is so crisp it crackles on the screen" and that "Matrix Reloaded re-establishes the genre and even raises the bar a notch or two" above the first film, The Matrix. Roger Ebert of the Chicago Sun-Times also commended the film, giving it three and a half stars out of four. He described it as "an immensely skillful sci-fi adventure, combining the usual elements: heroes and villains, special effects and stunts, chases and explosions, romance and oratory" and praised the fact that "it develops its world with more detail than the first movie was able to afford, gives us our first glimpse of the underground human city of Zion, burrows closer to the heart of the secret of the Matrix, and promotes its hero, Neo, from confused draftee to a Christ figure in training." He also compared the choreography of the "Burly Brawl" fight to that of Yuen Woo-ping in the 2000 film Crouching Tiger, Hidden Dragon, and called the scene "one of the three great set pieces in the movie" (along with Morpheus' announcement to the people of Zion and the freeway chase).

Negative comments included the sentiment that the plot was alienating, with some critics regarding the focus on the action as a detriment to the film's human elements. Some critics thought that the number of scenes with expository dialogue worked against the film, and the many unresolved subplots, as well as the cliffhanger ending, were also criticized. Other criticisms included the film's perceived lack of pacing. Entertainment Weekly named it as one of "The 25 Worst Sequels Ever Made".

Awards

Censorship
The film was initially banned in Egypt because of the violent content and because it put into question issues about human creation, "which are related to the three divine religions."

Home media 
The Matrix Reloaded was released on VHS and DVD on October 14, 2003. On the first day release, the DVD release sold over 4 million units. A Blu-ray release followed on September 7, 2010. The Matrix Reloaded was released as a part of The Matrix Trilogy on 4K UHD Blu-ray on October 30, 2018.

See also
 Simulated reality
 List of films featuring powered exoskeletons

Notes

References

External links

 
 
 

2000s American films
2000s English-language films
2000s French-language films
2003 action thriller films
2003 films
2003 martial arts films
2003 science fiction action films
American action thriller films
American science fiction action films
American science fiction thriller films
American sequel films
Cyberpunk films
Drone films
Films about computer hacking
Films about mathematics
Films about rebellions
Films about telepresence
Films directed by The Wachowskis
Films produced by Joel Silver
Films scored by Don Davis (composer)
Films shot in California
Films shot in Sydney
Films with screenplays by The Wachowskis
Gun fu films
Kung fu films
Martial arts science fiction films
Resurrection in film
Silver Pictures films
The Matrix (franchise) films
Village Roadshow Pictures films
Warner Bros. films